Herrstein-Rhaunen is a Verbandsgemeinde ("collective municipality") in the district of Birkenfeld, Rhineland-Palatinate, Germany. The seat of the Verbandsgemeinde is in Herrstein. It was formed on 1 January 2020 by the merger of the former Verbandsgemeinden Herrstein and Rhaunen.

The Verbandsgemeinde Herrstein-Rhaunen consists of the following Ortsgemeinden ("local municipalities"):

 Allenbach 
 Asbach 
 Bergen 
 Berschweiler bei Kirn 
 Bollenbach 
 Breitenthal 
 Bruchweiler 
 Bundenbach
 Dickesbach 
 Fischbach 
 Gerach 
 Gösenroth
 Griebelschied 
 Hausen 
 Hellertshausen 
 Herborn 
 Herrstein
 Hettenrodt 
 Hintertiefenbach 
 Horbruch 
 Hottenbach 
 Kempfeld 
 Kirschweiler 
 Krummenau 
 Langweiler 
 Mackenrodt 
 Mittelreidenbach 
 Mörschied 
 Niederhosenbach 
 Niederwörresbach 
 Oberhosenbach 
 Oberkirn
 Oberreidenbach 
 Oberwörresbach 
 Rhaunen
 Schauren 
 Schmidthachenbach
 Schwerbach 
 Sensweiler 
 Sien 
 Sienhachenbach 
 Sonnschied 
 Stipshausen 
 Sulzbach 
 Veitsrodt 
 Vollmersbach 
 Weiden 
 Weitersbach 
 Wickenrodt 
 Wirschweiler

External links
Official website

Verbandsgemeinde in Rhineland-Palatinate